The barred long-tailed cuckoo (Cercococcyx montanus) is a species of cuckoo in the family Cuculidae.
It is found in the Albertine Rift montane forests and disjunctly throughout East Africa.

References

External links
 Barred long-tail cuckoo - Species text in The Atlas of Southern African Birds.

barred long-tailed cuckoo
Birds of Central Africa
Birds of East Africa
barred long-tailed cuckoo
barred long-tailed cuckoo
Taxonomy articles created by Polbot